The Astron wristwatch, formally known as the Seiko Quartz-Astron 35SQ, was the world's first "quartz clock" wristwatch. It is now registered on the List of IEEE Milestones as a key advance in electrical engineering.

The Astron was unveiled in Tokyo on December 25, 1969, after ten years of research and development at Suwa Seikosha (currently named Seiko Epson), a manufacturing company of Seiko Group. Within one week 100 gold watches had been sold, at a retail price of 450,000 yen (US$1,250) each (at the time, equivalent to the price of a medium-sized car). According to Seiko, Astron was accurate to ±5 seconds per month or one minute per year, and its battery life was 1 year or longer.

Anniversaries 
In March 2010, at the Baselworld watch fair and trade show in Switzerland, Seiko previewed a limited edition new version of the watch and related designs of the original Astron watch, commemorating the fortieth anniversary in December 2009 of the debut of the Astron watch.

References and footnotes
 
 
  (alternate version)

Further reading 
 "Seiko Quartz 35 SQ: The Seiko 35 SQ Astron was the first quartz watch on the market", Smithsonian Institution website.
 Thompson, Joe, "1969: Seiko’s Breakout Year", WatchTime Magazine, December 20, 2009

Products introduced in 1969
History of electronic engineering
Watch models
Seiko
Epson
Japanese inventions